Railway stations in Montenegro include:

Towns served by rail

Belgrade-Bar railway 
Along the Montenegrin part of Belgrade–Bar railway, there are 5 railway stations and 31 train stops. They are listed here from north to south:

 Sutivan
 Bijelo Polje
 Lješnica
 Kruševo
 Ravna Rijeka
 Slijepač Most
 Mijatovo Kolo
 Žari
 Mojkovac
 Štitarička Rijeka
 Trebaljevo
 Oblutak
 Kolašin
 Padež
 Mateševo
 Kos
 Selište
 Trebešica
 Kruševački Potok
 Lutovo
 Pelev Brijeg
 Bratonožići
 Podkrš
 Bioče
 Zlatica
 Podgorica
 Aerodrom
 Golubovci
 Morača
 Zeta
 Vranjina
 Virpazar
 Crmnica
 Sutomore
 Šušanj
 Bar

Nikšić-Podgorica railway 
Along this line, there are 5 railway stations and 7 train stops:

 Nikšić
 Stubica
 Dabovići
 Ostrog
 Šobajići
 Bare Šumanovića
 Slap
 Danilovgrad
 Ljutotuk
 Spuž
 Pričelje
 Podgorica

Podgorica–Shkodër railway 
Along the Montenegrin part of this line, there is one train station and one train stop:

 Podgorica
 Tuzi

 
Railway stations
Railway stations